Como Tu, Ninguna is a Venezuelan telenovela created by Alberto Gómez and Carlos Romero, and produced by Venevisión in 1994. The series lasted for 318 episodes and was distributed internationally by Venevisión International.

The telenovela marked the debut of Gabriela Spanic in her first lead role
,accompanied by Eduardo Luna and Miguel de León as the protagonists, with Bárbara Teyde, Henry Galué, Fabiola Colmenares and Marita Capote as antagonists.

Synopsis

Gilda Barreto's dream comes true when she marries Raymundo Landaeta, a rich and handsome young man who does not mind her poor upbringing. Their love is deep and sincere but too young and fragile to withstand the evils the couple must face at the hands of Leonidas Landaeta, Raymundo's mother. Leonidas is a selfish, arrogant and domineering woman who has different plans for her son: marry him to Yamilex, a woman of their same social level. She dedicates wholeheartedly to separate Raymundo from Gilda, using Yamilex as her accomplice. Leonidas relentless efforts to break up the marriage succeed within a short period of time, causing Raymundo and Gilda to divorce. Emotionally destroyed, Gilda returns to her former life of poverty, working hard at odd jobs to earn a decent living. Raymundo goes on a long trip abroad and upon his return home, becomes involved with Yamilex. After Raymundo and Yamilex become an item, Gilda finds her real true love, Raul, a lovin successful doctor which falls in love with Gilda instantly and accepts her as she is and accepts the child she had with Raymundo.

Cast

Main Cast
Gabriela Spanic as Gilda Barreto/Raquel Sandoval
Miguel de León as Raúl de la Peña
Eduardo Luna as Raymundo Landaeta
Elluz Peraza as Mariza Monales
Henry Galué as Braulio Monales

Supporting Cast

Laura Termini as Amalia
Bárbara Teyde as Leonidas de Landaeta
Carolina López as Alina Fuenmayor
Miguel Alcántara as Maximiliane Ruiz
Belén Díaz as Lucrecia de la Peña
Laura Zerra as Eulalia
Juan Carlos Vivas as Bernardo Sandoval
Angélica Arenas as Daniela Sandoval
Lizbeth Manrique as Katy Sandoval
David Bermúdez as Álvaro Pacheco " El Tarántula"
Marita Capote as Silvia Machado
Aura Elena Dinisio as Silvia Machado 
Hilda Blanco as Asunción Marcheno
Lucy Orta as Magdalena Machado
Rita De Gois as Cecilia de Acevedo
Olga Henríquez as Rosalía
Mauricio González as juez Gómez
Hans Christopher as Argenis Sabala
Estelita Del Llano as Zulema Suárez
Isabel Hungría as Remigia
Martha Carbillo as Celsa, criada de Rosalía
Omar Moynelo as Demetrio Azevedo
Julio Capote as Señor del Mar
Verónica Doza as Verónica Beltrán, encargada del Orfanatorio
Orlando Casín as Doctor Argelis
José Ángel Urdaneta as Andrés
Chumico Romero as Laura
Manolo Manolo as Rafael
Mónica Rubio as Elsa de la Peña
Fabiola Colmenares as Jamilex Jil
Denise Novell as Immaculada Marcheno
Yalitza Hernández as Lilia
Diego Acuña as Rigoberto Sabadis

Remake
In 2017, Televisa made a new version of this telenovela entitled El vuelo de la victoria, produced by Nathalie Lartilleux, adapted by María Antonieta Calú Gutiérrez, and starring Paulina Goto, Andrés Palacios and Mane de la Parra.

Curiosities

Throughout the series, Gabriela Spanic met her later husband, Miguel de León, whom she initially found displeased with.

The series Gabriela Spanic had a double role, like Paula and Paulina, and La Intrusa bye series.

Carlos Romero noticed Gabriela Spanic in this series, then offered the double starring role of Paula and Paulina to the actress.

The series remains the most popular series in Venezuela was sold in a total of 80 countries.

References

External links

Opening Credits

1995 telenovelas
Venevisión telenovelas
Venezuelan telenovelas
1995 Venezuelan television series debuts
1995 Venezuelan television series endings
Spanish-language telenovelas
Television shows set in Caracas